Bertil Persson (30 April 1914 – 19 November 1978) was a Swedish alpine skier. He competed in the men's combined event at the 1936 Winter Olympics.

References

External links
 

1914 births
1978 deaths
Swedish male alpine skiers
Olympic alpine skiers of Sweden
Alpine skiers at the 1936 Winter Olympics
People from Åre Municipality
Sportspeople from Jämtland County
20th-century Swedish people